The Honda Motocompo is a folding scooter sold by Honda 1981–1983. It was the smallest scooter ever produced by Honda and it folded into a rectangle for easy storage.

History
Released in Shetland White, Daisy Yellow and Caribbean Red variants, the Motocompo was introduced as a "trunk bike" (trabai) to fit inside subcompact cars like the Honda Today and the (then new) Honda City. The City's baggage compartment was actually developed around the Motocompo. It is the smallest scooter ever built by Honda. The company's initial monthly sales projection for the domestic market was 8,000 City and 10,000 Motocompo. The City surpassed its targets, but in all only 53,369 Motocompos were sold by the end of production in 1983 (no more than 3,000 per month). 
The scooter was marketed in conjunction with the City in television ads featuring British ska/2-tone band Madness.

Although discontinued in 1983, Honda has revisited the idea since with several concept vehicles such as the 2001 e-Dax and e-NSR, and the 2011 Motor Compo electric scooter.

In fiction
The Motocompo is used by Natsumi Tsujimoto in You're Under Arrest.  It is tucked away at the back of her partner Miyuki Kobayakawa's Honda Today police car when not in use. It was released as a Bandai model kit.

A Motocompo is the inspiration for the character Sou in the Kino's Journey —the Beautiful World— anime and manga series.

References

 Infobox specifications from these honda.co.jp pages on 2008-02-19: 
Here
Here

External links

 Folding Video at honda.co.jp  
 Motocompo Owners Gallery at honda.co.jp  (archived)
 Honda Motocompo  brochure at Product Design Data Base 
 Flickr photo results for 'Honda Motocompo'

Motocompo
Motor scooters
Motorcycles introduced in 1981
Two-stroke motorcycles